Kiss Me First is a 2003 Italian comedy film directed by Ambrogio Lo Giudice. It was entered into the 26th Moscow International Film Festival. It won the Nastro d'Argento for best original song ("Prima dammi un bacio" by Lucio Dalla).

Cast
 Stefania Rocca as Adele
 Marco Cocci as Marcello
 Luca Zingaretti as Loris
 Camilla Filippi as Jane
 Fiorella Mannoia as Irene

References

External links
 

2003 films
2003 comedy films
2000s Italian-language films
Italian comedy films